The 29th Annual Gotham Independent Film Awards, presented by the Independent Filmmaker Project, were held on December 2, 2019. The nominees were announced on October 24, 2019. Actors Sam Rockwell and Laura Dern, director Ava DuVernay and producer Glen Basner received tribute awards.

Winners and nominees

Film

Television

Special awards

Made in NY Award
 Jason DaSilva

Gotham Tributes
 Glen Basner
 Laura Dern
 Ava DuVernay
 Sam Rockwell

References

External links
 

2019 film awards
2019